Trifluoroethane may refer to either of two isomeric fluorocarbons which differ by the location of attachment of the fluorine atoms:
1,1,1-Trifluoroethane (R-143a)
1,1,2-Trifluoroethane (R-143b)

Both are used as refrigerant and propellant gases.

Fluoroalkanes
Refrigerants